Playdate is a Canadian drama anthology television series which aired on CBC Television from 1961 to 1964.

Premise
The series replaced General Motors Presents. Ed Moser, a story editor from that previous series, became executive producer of Playdate. He reduced the presence of Canadian script writers, featuring nine Canadian-written scripts in the final season of Playdate compared to 19 Canadian works featured in the final season of General Motors Presents.

Robert Goulet hosted the earliest episodes of Playdate, replaced by Christopher Plummer from 20 December 1961. From October 1962, episodes of the UK series The Jo Stafford Show were occasionally broadcast, billed by the CBC as Playdate Presents.... In September 1963, similar treatment was given to The Red Skelton Show, an American series, when it was sporadically broadcast in the Playdate time slot.

The CBC cancelled Playdate and Parade by June 1964, as part of a general reduction in variety programming for the 1964–65 season. In the months following the last Playdate episode, The Red Skelton Show was regularly seen in the time slot.

In 1964, 26 episodes of Playdate were sold for broadcast in Australia.

Episode
This hour-long series was broadcast over three seasons as follows (times in Eastern zone):

Season 1: 1961–62

Broadcasts of Playdate for the first season were Wednesdays at 8:00 p.m. (Eastern time):

Summer Playdate 1962

Summer Playdate consisted of broadcasts of UK productions in a Tuesday 9:30 p.m. evening time slot between regular seasons of Playdate, from July to September 1962. Episodes were generally British mysteries.

Season 2: 1962–63

Broadcasts were Thursdays at 9:00 p.m. (Eastern time):

Season 3: 1963–64
Broadcast Mondays at 9:00 p.m. (Eastern time) from 30 September 1963 to 20 July 1964 as follows:

References

Bibliography

External links
 
 
Playdate at TVArchive.ca

1961 Canadian television series debuts
1964 Canadian television series endings
CBC Television original programming
1960s Canadian anthology television series